Ishaque Hossain Talukder was a Bangladesh Awami League politician and the former Member of Parliament of Sirajganj-3.

Early life
Talukder was born on 18 June 1950.

Career
Talukder was elected to parliament from Sirajganj-3 as a Bangladesh Awami League candidate in 2008.

Death
Talukder died on 6 October 2014.

References

Awami League politicians
2014 deaths
9th Jatiya Sangsad members